Jonathan Chang (張洋洋) (Wade–Giles: Chang Yang2 Yang2) (born May 1, 1991) is a Taiwanese actor, most known for his role as "Yang Yang" in Edward Yang's 2000 film Yi Yi.

Career
Chang was selected to play "Yang Yang" in Edward Yang's film Yi Yi (2000) when he was only nine years old, which Yang won the Cannes Best Director award for that year. The film ended up winning a number of awards, including ranking #3 or higher on various "Top 10 Films of the Decade" lists, covering the decades spanning from 1990-2000.

After Yi Yi, Chang appeared in the feature film Da-Yu: The Touch of Fate (2006), directed by Chih-yuan Pan, where he played the title character, Da-Yu. The film ended up being nominated for four awards at the 2006 Golden Horse Film Festival: Best Supporting Actor (Matt Chung-Tien Wu), Best Original Screenplay (Chih-yuan Pan and Hsueh-Jung Liu), Best New Performer (Matt Chung-Tien Wu) and the Formosa Award.

Chang next appeared in the feature film God Man Dog as the character Hsien. The film was directed by Singing Chen, and won the Reader Jury of the "Tagesspiegel" Award at the 2008 Berlin Film Festival or Berlinale. The film also won a Best Screenplay award (for writers Singing Chen and Lou Yi-an) at the 2008 Durban International Film Festival, and the E-Changer award for Singing Chen at the 2008 Fribourg International Film Festival.

In 2012, Chang starred in the short film Before Summer Rain directed and written by Hong-ren Chen aka Isara Chen. The film screened at a number of film festivals, including the 2014 Golden Horse Film Festival and the 2014 Los Angeles Asian Pacific Film Festival. In the film, Chang plays the older brother of the main character, his sister. The older brother eventually gets cancer, which tests the bonds between the siblings.

Filmography 
 Yi Yi (2000)
 Before Summer Rain (2012)

References

External links

Jonathan Chang Credits on Douban (Mandarin)
Interview with Jonathan Chang (Mandarin)
Jonathan Chang Discusses a Film Project (Mandarin)

1991 births
Living people
Taiwanese male film actors
Male actors from Taipei
20th-century Taiwanese male actors
21st-century Taiwanese male actors